William Mackey House may refer to:

William Mackey House (Houston, Texas), listed on the National Register of Historic Places in Harris County, Texas
William Mackey House (Cornwall, Virginia), listed on the National Register of Historic Places in Rockbridge County, Virginia